Pierre Paulus (1881–1959), later Baron Pierre Paulus de Châtelet, was a Belgian expressionist painter. He is best known as the designer of the "bold rooster" adopted on 3 July 1913 as the symbol of the Walloon Movement and today the flag of Wallonia.

Paulus gained notability during the Walloon Art Exposition of Charleroi in 1911 and, in the interwar period, he held several exhibitions in Europe and in the United States.

References

Notes

External links 
  Biography in "Cent Wallons du Siècle", Institut Jules Destrée, Charleroi, 1995
 Short bio on Charleroi's Museum of fine arts website
 Biography at the Dictionnaire des Wallons

Barons of Belgium
Walloon movement activists
Walloon people
People from Châtelet
1881 births
1959 deaths
20th-century Belgian painters